BBC Sessions is an album by Tindersticks, released on Island Records in 2007.  The double CD compiled 26 tracks recorded by the band for the BBC between 1993 and 1997.

References

Tindersticks albums
BBC Radio recordings
2007 live albums
2007 compilation albums
Island Records compilation albums
Island Records live albums